Stacey Michelsen (born 18 February 1991) is a New Zealand field hockey player. She has competed for the New Zealand women's national field hockey team (the Black Sticks Women), including for the team at the 2010, 2014 and 2018 Commonwealth Games and the 2012 and 2016 Summer Olympics.

Career
Michelsen was first selected for the Black Sticks Women in June 2009, along with ten other players as the Black Sticks squad was overhauled following its last place finish at the 2008 Beijing Olympics. In February 2012, she was named the 2011 women's Young Player of the Year in the International Hockey Federation's (FIH) Player of the Year Awards.

Born in Whangarei, Michelsen attended Kamo Intermediate and Kamo High School in Whangarei and St Cuthbert's College in Auckland. She studies law and business at the University of Auckland. She announced her retirement from international play on 21 October 2021.

References

External links

1991 births
Living people
Field hockey players from Whangārei
People educated at St Cuthbert's College, Auckland
New Zealand female field hockey players
Olympic field hockey players of New Zealand
Field hockey players at the 2010 Commonwealth Games
Field hockey players at the 2012 Summer Olympics
Field hockey players at the 2014 Commonwealth Games
Commonwealth Games silver medallists for New Zealand
Commonwealth Games bronze medallists for New Zealand
Field hockey players at the 2016 Summer Olympics
Commonwealth Games medallists in field hockey
Female field hockey midfielders
Commonwealth Games gold medallists for New Zealand
Field hockey players at the 2018 Commonwealth Games
People educated at Kamo High School
Field hockey players at the 2020 Summer Olympics
20th-century New Zealand women
21st-century New Zealand women
Medallists at the 2010 Commonwealth Games
Medallists at the 2014 Commonwealth Games
Medallists at the 2018 Commonwealth Games